Mar Jawan Gur Khake is a 2010 Punjabi film directed by Aditya Sood and produced by Jagdish Sahota. The film was released on 3 December 2010.

Plot 
Jimmy (Jimmy Sharma) and Rocky (Tarun Khanna) are two enemies who are involved in fights / brawls daily. They both fall in love with Mehak (Gunjan Walia) who is already in love with a secret-gangster Karan (Aman Verma). When Karan gets arrested and put in jail by Inspector (Gurpreet Ghuggi), Mehak's father, a bigger don that Karan asks Rocky and Jimmy to rescue him, although the two lovers do not know that Mehak and Karan would get married. When they rescue him and take him back, they seem to find out the truth and Meha also finds out about Karan's real crime identity. When Karan shoots Jimmy, he survives but goes to the hospital. That is when Mehak tells him that she actually loves Rocky. Karan then gets arrested.

The film ends with Rocky and Mehak getting married, as Jimmy comes to wish them.

Cast
 Jimmy Sharma as Jimmy 
 Tarun Khanna as Rocky, Mehak's Husband
 Gunjan Walia as Mehak, Rocky's wife
 Gurpreet Ghuggi as Sr. Inspector
 Shakti Kapoor as Don
 Sanjay Mishra as Professor Mishra 
 Upasana Singh as Harleen Madam
 Aman Verma as Karan
 Mehar Mittal as DJ Walia
 Gopi Bhalla as Gopi
 Bobby Darling in a special appearance.

External links
 

2010 films
Punjabi-language Indian films
2010s Punjabi-language films